The Grey Art Gallery is New York University’s fine art museum, located on historic Washington Square Park, in New York City's Greenwich Village. As a university art museum, the Grey Art Gallery functions to collect, preserve, study, document, interpret, and exhibit the evidence of human culture. While these goals are common to all museums, the Grey distinguishes itself by emphasizing art's historical, cultural, and social contexts, with experimentation and interpretation as integral parts of programmatic planning. Thus, in addition to being a place to view the objects of material culture, the Gallery serves as a museum-laboratory in which a broader view of an object's environment enriches our understanding of its contribution to civilization.

In 1974, Abby Weed Grey established the Grey Art Gallery (originally known as the Grey Art Gallery and Study Center) at New York University, both as a permanent home for her art collection and to promote international artistic exchange in an academic setting. The museum opened to the public in 1975. The Abby Weed Grey Collection of Modern Asian and Middle Eastern Art at NYU comprises some 700 works produced by artists from countries as diverse as Japan, Thailand, India, Kashmir, Nepal, Pakistan, Iran, Turkey, and Israel. Mrs. Grey's vision was bold and simple: one world through art. Believe that art, as a universal language, could serve as a potent vehicle for knowledge, communication, and understanding, Mrs. Grey formed this unique collection while traveling in Asia and the Middle East in the 1960s and '70s. The Abby Weed Grey Collection constitutes the largest institutional holdings of modern Iranian and Turkish art outside those countries.

The Grey Art Gallery also oversees the art collection of New York University. Founded in 1958 with the acquisition of Francis Picabia's Resonateur (1922) and Fritz Glarner's Relational Painting (1949–50), the NYU Art Collection comprises approximately 5,000 works, mainly dating from the 19th and 20th centuries, such as Pablo Picasso's Bust of Sylvette (1967), currently installed at University Village (Manhattan); Joseph Cornell's Chocolat Menier (1952); and works by Henri Matisse, Joan Miró, and Ilya Bolotowsky, as well as Romare Bearden, Arshile Gorky, Adolph Gottlieb, Kenneth Noland, Jane Freilicher, Ad Reinhardt, and Alex Katz, among many others.

History

History of the Building 
The Grey Art Gallery's location is rich in cultural history. The gallery is housed in the Silver Center (formerly Main Building), on the site on NYU's original home, the legendary University Building (1835–94), where many famous artists and writers, including Samuel Colt, Winslow Homer, George Inness, and Henry James, worked. It was also here that Professor Samuel F. B. Morse established the first academic art department in the U.S.

Between 1927 and 1942, the space now occupied by the Grey Art Gallery hosted A. E. Gallatin's Gallery (later Museum) of Living Art—the first American museum exclusively devoted to modernist art. In exhibiting work by Pablo Picasso, Fernand Léger, Joan Miró, Kazimir Malevich, Piet Mondrian, Jean Arp, and artists associated with the American Abstract Artists group, Gallatin created a forum for intellectual exchange and a place where visitors could view the latest developments in art. NYU lacked a permanent museum until 1975, when a private donation gift from Mrs. Abby Weed Grey enabled the historic venue's renovation and improvement of the historic venue, and the doors reopened as the Grey Art Gallery and Study Center in 1975.

History of the Gallery 
Founder and patron of the Grey Art Gallery, Mrs. Abby Weed Grey collected some 700 works of modern art on her travels throughout Asia and the Middle East.

A native of Saint Paul, Minnesota and a graduate of Vassar College, Mrs. Grey established the Ben and Abby Grey Foundation to sponsor artists. She called for a more complex understanding of works by contemporary artists around the world, acknowledging their interest in local popular and folk forms as well as interactions with modernism. Throughout the 1960s and 1970s, Mrs. Grey undertook curatorial projects such as Fourteen Contemporary Iranians (1962–65) and Turkish Art Today (1966–70), each of which toured the United States; Communication Through Art (1964), which opened simultaneously in Istanbul, Tehran, and Lahore, before traveling throughout the eastern Mediterranean, Asia, and eastern Africa; and One World Through Art. By 1979, Mrs. Grey had become one of American's prominent collectors of Asian and Middle Eastern art.

Mrs. Grey served on the Board of Trustees of The Minnesota Society of Fine Arts (1967–1973) and the Minneapolis College of Art and Design’s Board of Overseers (1964–1983).  She endowed the Grey Fellowship in Museum Studies at the Walker Art Center, and in 1979, established and endowed The Grey Fine Arts Library and Study Center, a resource in NYU's Department of Art History (formerly Department of Fine Arts).

Collections

Abby Weed Grey Collection of Modern Asian and Middle Eastern Art 
The gallery was endowed by Abby Weed Grey, who also donated some 700 works of modern art that she acquired during her frequent travels in Asia and the Middle East. Mrs. Grey was especially supportive of Iranian art, which comprises one-fifth of her collection at NYU. She also donated significant holdings of works by artists from Turkey and India. Many of the artists whose works she collected adapted their culture's indigenous aesthetic traditions to contemporary circumstances, and they often blend representation and abstraction.

Iranian Art 
 
Artists include: Mahmud Ahmadi, Siah Armajani, Jamal Bakhshpour, Kamran Diba, Bijan Dowlatshahi, Ahmad Esfandiari, Mansour Ghandriz, Behrooz Golzari, Marcos Grigorian, Mahmoud Javadipour, Sirous Malek, Morteza Momayez, Mir-Hossein Mousavi Khameneh, Nassar Ovissi, Ru’in Pakbaz, Faramarz Pilaram, Behjat Sadr, Sohrab Sepehri, Masoumeh Seyhoun, Jazeh Tabatabai, Sadegh Tabrizi, Parviz Tanavoli, Esmail Tavakoli, Hamid Zarrine-Afsar, Charles-Hossein Zenderoudi.

Turkish Art 
Artists include: Mustafa Aslier, Aliye Berger, Nurullah Berk, Sabri Berkel, Sadan Bezeyis, Abidin Elderoglu, Dervim Erbil, Bedri Rahmi Eyüboğlu, Ahmet Gürsoy, Nevil Islek, Özer Kabas, Füreya Koral, Princess Fahrelnissa Zeid.

Indian Art 
Artists include: Prabhakar Barwe, Dhanraj Bhagat, Satish Gujral, Maqbool Fida Husain, Kanwal Krishna, Krishna Reddy, Francis Newton Souza, Vivan Sundaram, Jehangir P. Vazifdar.

The New York University Art Collection 
The New York University Art Collection, of which the Grey Art Gallery is now guardian, was founded in 1958 with NYU's acquisition of Francis Picabia’s Resonateur (c.1922) and Fritz Glarner’s Relational Painting (1949–50). Today the collection (which includes approximately 6,000 objects) is primarily composed of late-19th and 20th-century works, ranging from Pablo Picasso’s monumental public sculpture Bust of Sylvette to a Joseph Cornell box, Chocolat Menier, from 1952. The collection's particular strength is American painting from the 1940s to the present. European prints are also well represented, with works by Henri Matisse, Joan Miró, and Picasso, to name a few.

Artists in the NYU Art Collection include: Milton Avery, Ilya Bolotowsky, Sonia Delaunay, Arshile Gorky, Édouard Manet, Francis Picabia, and many others. The collection is especially rich in works by artists working in New York in the 1950s and '60s, such as Willem de Kooning, Helen Frankenthaler, Adolph Gottlieb, Al Held, Romare Bearden, Hans Hofmann, Alex Katz, Nicholas Krushenick, Yayoi Kusama, Agnes Martin, Robert Motherwell, Louise Nevelson, Kenneth Noland, Robert Rauschenberg, Ad Reinhardt, and Bernard (Tony) Rosenthal.

Selected exhibitions

 1975: Inaugural Exhibition: Selections from the Abby Weed Grey Collection
 1976: Inaugural Exhibition, Part II: Selections from the New York University Art Collection
 1976: Parviz Tanavoli: Fifteen Years of Bronze Sculpture
 1978: The Decorative Designs of Frank Lloyd Wright. Co-organized by the Smithsonian American Art Museum and the Grey Art Gallery and Study Center
 1981: The Photography of Space Exploration
 1981: Tracking The Marvelous
 1983: Frida Kahlo and Tina Modotti Organized by the Whitechapel Art Gallery, London
 1984: Giovanni Boldini and Society Portraiture: 1880–1920
 1985: Precious: An American Cottage Industry of the Eighties
 1989: "Success Is a Job in New York": The Early Art and Business of Andy Warhol. Organized by the Grey Art Gallery and the Carnegie Museum of Art, Pittsburg.
 1989: Against Nature: Japanese Art in the Eighties. Organized by the List Visual Arts Center at MIT, the Japan Foundation, and the Grey Art Gallery
 1994: From Media to Metaphor: Art About AIDS. Organized by the Grey Art Gallery and Independent Curators Inc.
 1997: Nahum B. Zenil: Witness to the Self
 1999: Inverted Odysseys: Claude Cahun, Maya Deren, Cindy Sherman
 1999: When Time Began to Rant and Rage: Figurative Painting from Twentieth-Century Ireland. Organized by the University of California, Berkeley Art Museum
 2002: Between Word and Image: Modern Iranian Visual Culture
 2004: Electrifying Art: Atsuko Tanaka, 1954–1968. Co-organized by the Grey Art Gallery and the Morris and Helen Belkin Art Gallery at the University of British Columbia, Vancouver
 2006: The Downtown Show: The New York Art Scene 1974–1984. Co-organized by the Grey Art Gallery and Fales Library, New York University
 2008: New York Cool: Painting and Sculpture from the NYU Art Collection, Grey Art Gallery, New York University
 2008: The Poetics of Cloth: African Textiles / Recent Art
 2009: Icons of the Desert: Early Aboriginal Paintings from Papunya. Organized by the Herbert F. Johnson Museum of Art at Cornell University
 2011: Art/Memory/Place: Commemorating the Triangle Shirtwaist Factory Fire
 2012: Jesús Rafael Soto: Paris and Beyond, 1950–1970
 2012: Toxic Beauty: The Art of Frank Moore. Organized by the Grey Art Gallery and presented at the Grey Art Gallery and Fales Library
 2015: Abby Grey and Indian Modernism: Selections from the NYU Art Collection
 2015: Tseng Kwong Chi: Performing for the Camera. Co-organized by the Grey Art Gallery and the Chrysler Museum of Art, Norfolk, Virginia.
 2016: Global/Local 1960–2015: Six Artists from Iran
 2017: Inventing Downtown: Artist-Run Galleries in New York City, 1952–1965
 2018: The Beautiful Brain: The Drawings of Santiago Ramón y Cajal. Organized by the Weisman Art Museum at the University of Minnesota in collaboration with the Cajal Institute, Spain
 2019: Art after Stonewall, 1969–1989. Organized by the Columbus Museum of Art, Columbus, Ohio
 2019: Modernisms: Iranian, Turkish, and Indian Highlights from NYU's Abby Weed Grey Collection
 2020: Taking Shape: Abstraction from the Arab World, 1950s–1980s. Co-curated with the Barjeel Art Foundation, Sharjah, UAE.

Awards

 1991 Alfred H. Barr Jr. Award for "Success is a Job in New York": The Early Art and Business of Andy Warhol, Carnegie Museum of Art, Pittsburgh, and Grey Art Gallery, New York University, New York, on view at the Grey March 14–April 29, 1989
 1997 AICA (The United States Section of the International Association of Art Critics) award for Shiro Kuramata 1934–1991, on view February 25–May 2, 1998 (Best Design Show)
 1999 AICA (The United States Section of the International Association of Art Critics) award for Inverted Odysseys: Claude Cahun, Maya Deren, Cindy Sherman, on view November 16, 1999 – January 29, 2000 (Best Photography Show)
 2007 AICA (The United States Section of the International Association of Art Critics) award for The Downtown Show: The New York Art Scene, 1974–1984, Grey Art Gallery and Fales Library, New York University, New York, on view January 10–April 1, 2006 (Best Thematic Museum Show in New York City)
 2007 Village Voice Best of NYC award (Best Didactic Gallery)
 2012 AICA (The United States Section of the International Association of Art Critics) award for The Poetics of Cloth: African Textiles / Recent Art, on view September 16–December 6, 2008 (Best Show in University Gallery)
 2012 AICA (The United States Section of the International Association of Art Critics) award for Toxic Beauty: The Art of Frank Moore, on view September 6–December 8, 2012 (Best Show in a University Gallery)
 2017 the Alice Award administered by Furthermore grants in publishing, a program of the J. M. Kaplan Fund, for Inventing Downtown: Artist-Run Galleries in New York City, 1952-1965 by Melissa Rachleff, co-published by the Grey Art Gallery and DelMonico Books*Prestel Publishing. (The Alice Short List)

Directors
 Robert R. Littman, 1976–1983
 Thomas Sokolowski, 1984–1996
 Lynn Gumpert, 1997–present

References

External links 

New York University
Guide to the Records of the Grey Art Gallery and Study Center

New York University
Art galleries established in 1958
1958 establishments in New York City
Art museums and galleries in Manhattan
University art museums and galleries in New York City
Art museums and galleries in New York City
University museums in New York (state)
Greenwich Village